HMS Belvidera was a 36-gun Royal Navy fifth-rate frigate built in Deptford in 1809. She saw action in the Napoleonic Wars and the War of 1812 and continued a busy career at sea into the middle of the 19th century. In 1846 she was reduced to harbour service, in 1860 she became a receiving ship, and she was finally disposed of in 1906.

Service
Belvidera was commissioned in January 1800 under Captain Charles Dashwood. In March, Captain Richard Byron replaced Dashwood.

That evening a boat from Belvedera sighted three Danish gun-vessels in a large bay. Next day, seven boats from the two frigates attacked the Danes. Two of the Danish vessels, Balder  and Thor, commanded by Lieutenants Dahlreup and Rasmusen, were schooner-rigged. Each mounted two long 24-pounders and six 6-pounder howitzers and had a crew of 45 men. The third gun-vessel carried one long 24-pounder and a crew of 25 men. The British captured both Balder and Thor without suffering any casualties, though the Danes lost four men killed. The remaining vessel, Gunboat No. 5, ran up a fiord where her crew abandoned her; the British then burnt her. 

In 1811, Belvidera became the flagship of Admiral Herbert Sawyer on the Halifax station in Nova Scotia.

Belvidera and USS Constitution

Belvidera had been shadowing Marengo captained by French privateer John Ordronaux. The British were not aware that war had been declared and after returning fire they managed to evade their pursuers during the night. Belvideras course during the fight had led the Americans away from a British convoy from Jamaica, allowing the convoy to escape attack. Belvidera arrived in Halifax on 27 June with three prizes that she captured on the way.
 
In the very light winds, both sides put out boats to tow the ships. Constitution gained an advantage by using her anchors to pull herself about four miles ahead of Belvidera. Captain Byron then copied the manoeuvre of Constitution and managed to bring the two ships within gunshot. They exchanged fire as a light breeze came up, and by daylight on 19 July Constitution, being newly out of port, was able to escape.

Prize-taking
For the remainder of the war, Belvidera was active in the blockade of the American coast, capturing many American merchant ships and privateers. Between 1 June 1812 and 14 December 1812, Belvidera captured a number of merchant vessels:
brig Malcolm, of 197 tons, sailing from Madeira to Portland, carrying dollars and wine (24 June);
ship Fortune, of 317 tons, sailing from Cape de Verde to Newbury Port, carrying salt (25 June).
ship Oronoko, of 427 tons, sailing from Lisbon to New York, in ballast (11 July; with Africa, Shannon, Aeolus and );
brig Hare, of 246 tons, sailing from Naples to Boston, with brandy, silks, oil, &c. (1 August); and,
schooner Friendship, of 98 tons, sailing from Charleston to New York, carrying cotton (11 September). Also, they captured the
ship Eleanor (23 July).

At the time of her capture she mounted 16 guns, had crew of 106 men and was under the command of Lieutenant William M. Crane.

On 21 August Belvidera captured the U.S. privateer 7-gun schooner Bunker's Hill, with 72 men. On 10 September Belvidera detained Citizen. Two days later Belvidera captured the American schooner Hiram.

Belvidera recaptured the Post Office Packet Service packet  on 5 January 1813. The  had captured Nocton 11 December 1812. Belvidera sent Nocton into Bermuda. After undergoing some refitting Nocton arrived back at Falmouth on 17 March.

She had a crew 28 men and was sailing from Baltimore to Bordeaux with a cargo of coffee, sugar, and logwood. In the engagement the British had six men wounded, one of whom later died, but Belvidera herself suffered no casualties. The Americans suffered 19 men wounded, including their captain, John Southcomb, before they struck. Southcomb died of his wounds and his body was taken ashore.

A week later Lottery convoyed several prizes to Bermuda. The British took Lottery into service as the 16-gun schooner .

Belvidera was among the numerous British warships that shared in the capture of the American ship St. Michael on 10 February.

On 19 December  and  captured Rising States. Belvidera and  shared in the proceeds of the capture by agreement with Jaseur. Then on Christmas Day, Belvidera captured the schooner , which was attempting to get from Wilmington, North Carolina, to Newcastle, Delaware. The US had purchased Vixen at Savannah, Georgia, in 1813 but when Belvidera captured her she had not yet received her armament of 14 guns nor naval stores.

On 7 March 1814, Belvidera,  and  captured the American privateer Mars. Mars was armed with 15 guns and had a crew of 70 men. A later report has them destroying her on 10 March. Belvidera was also among the vessels sharing in the proceeds of the capture of the brigs Christina and Massasoit on 3 and 14 March.

On 21 April 1814, Belvidera captured the US ship , of 256 tons, armed with six guns and with a crew of 17 men. She was sailing from the Marquesas to Philadelphia carrying a cargo of spermaceti oil. In addition Belvidera captured the following American vessels:
schooner Nancy and Polly, carrying shingles (19 June);
sloop Alonzo (22 June);
sloop Hunter, of 60 tons and nine men, sailing from New Burn to New York, carrying tar and turpentine (24 June).

Post-war
At the end of 1814, Belvidera was decommissioned at Portsmouth. She was relaunched on 26 September 1817, having been refitted. She made numerous cruises to the Mediterranean, Portugal, Madeira, and the West Indies. In 1834 she took troops to St Kitts and then on a second trip, to Trinidad. On 17 May 1835 she was reported to be at Puerto Rico, where she was attempting to recover either escaped slaves, or slaves that had been improperly sold.

In October 1846 Belvidera was fitted at Portsmouth as a store depot.

Extract from Tobermory, Isle of Mull Old Parish Records dated 23 August 1847 :-
Robert Kerslake Royal Marine on board H M Ship Belvidera at Tobermory Bay and Ann McQuarrie servant or nurse to a Captain Wellington of H M Ship Belvidara Stationed at Tobermory were married by Revd David Ross Minister of Tobermory.

Fate
Belvidera was fitted as a receiving ship in between August and November 1852, and she served in that role at Portsmouth until 1890.She was sold on 10 July 1906 to J.B. Garham for £1,800.

Notes

Citations

References
 
 

 
 
 

Frigates of the Royal Navy
1809 ships
Apollo-class frigates
Ships built in Deptford
War of 1812 ships of the United Kingdom